The Nationalistische Studentenvereniging (NSV) (Dutch; "Nationalist Student Association") is a far-right Flemish nationalist student political group in Belgium, with chapters in Antwerp, Brussels, Ghent, Leuven, West Flanders (including Bruges, Roeselare, Ostend and Kortrijk), Hasselt and Mechelen.

History

The NSV was founded in 1976 by Edwin Truyens as a radical splinter group of the Katholiek Vlaams Hoogstudentenverbond (KVHV; "Catholic Flemish Student Union"). This split occurred after the national council of the KVHV resented the radical Flemish nationalist stances of Truyens and his faction, including accepting nothing less than full Flemish independence.

Throughout their history, they have made the news several times by being present at demonstrations of the radical fringe of the Flemish Movement. They are considered the counterweight to leftist student organisations in the universities and other institutions of higher education. Despite the controversy surrounding the NSV's radical profile, it is recognized at all the large Flemish universities and maintains a large membership. The NSV celebrated its 30th anniversary in 2006.

Ideology
The NSV maintains an ideology of conservative, radical nationalism and is very active in the Flemish Movement. Many top figures in the Vlaams Belang (formerly Vlaams Blok) started their political activities in the NSV, but the organization still claims party-political independence. They also have very close ties to other grassroots organisations in the Flemish independence movement like the Vlaamse Volksbeweging (VVB) and Voorpost. Smaller numbers of former NSV members have also been elected to office for the newer and more moderate New Flemish Alliance party.

Internationally the NSV maintains informal relations with several European nationalist organizations, such as Generation Identity, the Movimento Giovani Padani and the publishing house Arktos.

Colours and symbols
Members of the NSV can be easily recognised by their grey student's hat and student's ribbons (a tradition in Flanders, imported in the early 20th century from Germany). The colours of their ribbons are black-white-red, these colours are also present on the student's hat. The black relates to the Flemish flag, and white and red are the heraldic colours of Antwerp (the city where the NSV was founded).

Notable (former) members of the NSV
 Frank Vanhecke (president of the Vlaams Belang from 1996–2008)
 Bruno Valkeniers (president of the Vlaams Belang from 2008-2012)
 Tom Van Grieken (president of the Vlaams Belang from 2014 until now)
 Filip Dewinter (leading member of the Vlaams Belang)

See also
 Nationalistisch Jong Studenten Verbond ("Nationalist Young Students Association"): An affiliated organization with similar ideological profile for secondary school students between 15 and 18 years old.
 Voorpost ("Frontline"): A radical right-wing (Diets) organization that works in close cooperation with the NSV.
 Katholiek Vlaams Hoogstudentenverbond ("Catholic Flemish Students Union"): a Roman Catholic and conservative Flemish nationalist student society that is active in Flemish universities.

References

External links
 Website of the Nationalistische Studentenvereniging (Dutch)
 Opinions and articles by NSV members

Student societies in Belgium